Milan Kujundžić Aberdar (1842 - 1893) was a Serbian poet, philosopher and politician.

Biography
He was born in Belgrade and given the name Janićije but later he changed it to Milan.His pseudonym Aberdar came from his collected poems.

He studied at the gymnasium in Belgrade and Pančevo, and enrolled the legal faculty of the Belgrade Lyceum. With the Turkish bombardment of Belgrade in 1862, he stopped his studies and joined the Serbian army. 

After that, he received a scholarship from the Serbian government to study philosophy in Vienna, Munich, Paris, and London. Before finishing his studies at Oxford, in 1866 he was back in Serbia, recalled by the Minister of Education, to take over the Department of Philosophy at the Grandes écoles.

He was a professor of philosophy at Belgrade's Grandes écoles, Secretary of the Serbian Learned Society (from 1873 to 1882), President of the National Assembly (from 1880 to 1885), Minister of Education (1886-1887), envoy of Rome, Youth Editor of Srbadije and poet.

King Milan Obrenović appointed him on 5 April 1887 the first 16 academicians of the Serbian Royal Academy, among them was Milan Kujundžić Aberdar.

He participated in the Serbian-Turkish wars of 1876-1878. and for that reason, he was promoted to Major, and later to Lieutenant-Colonel. Among the many decorations he received, the most significant are: the medal of the regeneration of the Serbian kingdom, the Order of the Cross of Takovo III degree, the Order of the White Eagle III degree, and the Order of the Cross of Takovo IV degree with swords.

Works
 Kratki pregled harmonije u svetu (A Short Outline of the Harmonies in the World)
 Filozofija u Srba (Philosophy Among Serbs)
  Šta je i koliko u naš urađeno na lođici? (What and How Much Was Done in Logic in Our Country?)
  Ide li svet na bolje ili na gore? (Is the world going for better or for worse?)
 Filozofska i društveno-politička shvatanja'' (Philosophical and Sociopolitical Conceptions)

See also
 Ljubomir Nedić
 Branislav Petronijević
 Ksenija Atanasijević
 Petar II Petrović Njegoš
 Jovan Došenović
 Božidar Knežević
 Svetozar Marković
 Dimitrije Matić
 Konstantin Cukić

References 

19th-century Serbian poets
19th-century male writers
Writers from Belgrade
1842 births
1893 deaths
Presidents of the National Assembly (Serbia)
Politicians from Belgrade
Serbian male poets
19th-century politicians
19th-century Serbian philosophers
Members of the Serbian Learned Society
Education ministers of Serbia